Ozell Wells (January 4, 1977) is a Dominican American basketball coach, scout, ordained minister, entrepreneur, author, lecturer and businessman.

Career 
He began scouting professional basketball talents in 1998, he worked with the Detroit Pistons doing youth camps and clinics at schools.
In the same period he served as Director of Scouting with Eurosport Enterprises in Montreal, Canada, shortly thereafter, he worked with the Grand Rapids Hoops in the Continental Basketball Association, after the demise of the CBA in 2000, he travelled to Riyadh, Saudi Arabia to coach Al Hilal.

He went to Tijuana, Mexico to coach the Tijuana Diablos in 2001, after Mexico he coached in the short lived NWBL, which was a minor league to the WNBA with the Grand Rapids Blizzard.

His next stop was in China with Zhejiang Wanma of the Chinese Basketball Association in 2003–2004, later that year, he went to Syria and coached Al-Jalaa SC, losing in the finals.

In 2004, he went to Dominican Republic and coached Pueblo Nuevo, CUPES and Gregorio Luperon, all clubs playing at different times of the year.

At the end of 2005, he returned to the Detroit Pistons, working in training camp, as a translator and an assistant for the coaching staff.

His next clubs were in Europe, where he coached in Ireland with Neptune Basketball Club during the season 2005–2006 and in Luxembourg with Wiltz Sangliers and BC Mess during the season 2006–2007.

In 2006 he went to Mexico to coach the Halcones de Guamúchil during Mexico's CIBACOPA.

In 2006–2007 he worked with the National Team of Luxembourg as an assistant coach (Youth & Senior Men), where he won 2nd place in the 2007 Games of the Small States of Europe.

In 2007, he moved to Estonia and coached BC Kraft Mööbel/Kohila, losing in the Korvpalli Meistriliiga quarterfinals.

After a sabbatical year, in 2009 he coached the Yemen National Basketball Team in the Arabian Championships, he then spent time in the Middle East, working in Bahrain and in Palestine.

In 2010, he coached the Women National Team of Trinidad & Tobago in the Centrobasket Games & Central American and Caribbean Games, in 2010, he also started Rebote Spordiklubi MTÜ in Estonia.

In 2010–2011, he coached in the ASEAN Basketball League, with the Brunei Barracudas.

In 2011, he signed in Estonia in Korvpalli Meistriliiga, as the Head Coach of Valga KK.

He also coached the Evolution Academy of Belgium in the 2012 Euro-Espoirs Tournoi in Duoai, Callais, France; where the team won 3rd place in the event. 

At the end of 2012, Wells coached in the Netherlands at the annual Basketball Days International Tournament, winning the bronze medal.

In 2013, his club Rebote SK MTÜ signed a partnership with Global Basketball, whereby Wells scouts talent, international games and consults with federations, clubs and players.

He is also serving as the Director of International Scouting with TransAtlantic Basketball

In January 2014, Ozell Wells authored and published "MONEY", subsequently translated into French, Spanish & German.

In summer 2014, his club Rebote SK signed a partnership with HOOPLIFE in Poland, whereby Wells scouts & trains youth talents.

Wells also was a featured lecturer at the 2014 & 2015 ESTVIA physiotherapist conferences.

December 2014, Wells collaborated with a group of authors to publish "FLEETING MOMENTS"

In September 2014, he went to Germany, Solingen and coach for the TSG Solingen.

2015 Wells contracted with All in Sport ASD as an Ambassador

In 2016 returned home to work with Panteras de San Marcos (Dominican Republic)

2020, Strategic partnership with N.U.B.A (New Unified Basketball Association ) using his long pedigree of experience in the international basketball market as well as established relationships with current NBA executives.

Offering experience from a variety of basketball related business in many countries, multiple different leagues and  3 national team organizations around the world in the past 2O years. As well as being an experienced professional coach, lecturer, writer, basketball analyst that specializes in international basketball.

The objective of this partnership is to develop a range of projects and structure. He will work to create further global visibility for the brand.

2020, also saw him invited into the world's largest anthology, MIRAKEE.

Personal life 
Wells is a father to a son, Emmanuel Wells, who is currently a toddler.

Wells is also a Christian minister. Ordained in 1994 by Joy In Jesus Christian Center, in 2001, he founded The Holistic Alliance. Starting the Alianza Holistico SRL in Dominican Republic in 2004, he proceeded to witness to youth at local schools and churches throughout the country. In 2012, he partnered in creating  Prince of Peace Film Group.

Awards and honors 
2002: XBL League finalist
2004: Syrian Basketball League finalist
2005: Dominican Republic Puerto Plata Regional League finalist
2006: Mexico
CIBACOPA ALL-STAR GAME
2007: 2007 Games of the Small States of Europe Silver Medal
2007: Korvpalli Meistriliiga, Estonia's National Cup Quarterfinalist
2008: Korvpalli Meistriliiga, Estonia's National Championship Quarterfinalist
2009: Palestine "Al Quds" Tournament finalist
2009: Morocco Arab Nations Cup
2010: Palestine PBBA Cup finalist
2010: Puerto Rico CENTROBASKET Championships
2010: Puerto Rico Central American and Caribbean Games
2011: Harjumaa Korvpallilit, Estonia Basketball Championship winner
2011: Harjumaa Korvpallilit, Estonia Coach of the Year
2011: Korvpalli Meistriliiga, Estonia's National Cup Quarterfinalist
2012: France "Euro-Espoirs" Bronze Medal Winner
2012: Holland BASKETBALLDAYS Bronze Medal Winner
2015: All in Sport Summer League Finalist(Italy)
2015: All in Sport All Star Game (Italy)
2015: Dudi Krainieri Summer League Finalist (Italy)
2015: Dudi Krainieri All Star Game (Italy)

Books 
 CO-AUTHOR (2020). MIRAKEE : (World's Largest Anthology).

References

External links 
 Ozell Wells personal tab on www.fiba.com
 Ozell Wells personal tab on www.eurobasket.com
 Ozell Wells Ozell Wells with Trans-Atlantic Basketball

1977 births
Living people
21st-century American businesspeople
American expatriate basketball people in China
American expatriate basketball people in Estonia
American expatriate basketball people in Ireland
American expatriate basketball people in Luxembourg
American expatriate basketball people in Mexico
American expatriate basketball people in Saudi Arabia
American expatriate basketball people in Syria
American men's basketball coaches
American men's basketball players
Basketball players from Michigan
High school basketball coaches in the United States
Sportspeople from Detroit
University of Michigan alumni